Pedro Marin may refer to:

Manuel Marulanda, nom de guerre of Colombian revolutionary, Pedro Antonio Marín
Pedro Marín, Spanish pop singer
Pedro Marin (politician)